Pingshan Square station is a station on Line 14 of Shenzhen Metro in Shenzhen, Guangdong, China, which is opened on 28 October 2022. It is located in Pingshan District.

Station layout

Exits

References

External links
 Shenzhen Metro Pingshan Square Station (Chinese)
 Shenzhen Metro Pingshan Square Station (English)

Railway stations in Guangdong
Shenzhen Metro stations
Railway stations in China opened in 2022